Nasser Fahimi (Persian: ناصر فهیمی), was born May 08, 1974, in Sanandaj, Kurdistan Province, Iran. He is a physician, human rights defender and a political prisoner of conscience in iran, And the first figure in the political history of Iran who formally requested the Islamic Republic to revoke his Iranian citizenship due to the type of government (dictatorship).  Iran.

Early life 
Nasser Fahimi was born on May 08, 1974 in Sanandaj, Kurdistan province of Iran.

Activity 
In an open letter addressed to the High Commissioner for Human Rights, Verónica Michelle Bachelet, and the President of the United States, Joe Biden, he called for the intensification of human rights condemnations against the Islamic Republic.

Arrest and imprisonment 
He was first arrested in 1998 during the protests aimed at condemning the supporting actions of the Turkish government for Abdullah Ocalan. Also, in 2010, after 21 days of being arrested in an unknown place, he was transferred to jail 209.

He was also sentenced to 10 years in prison In 2014, by Abolqasem Salavati on the charge of "administration of opposition groups". In 2015, he was sentenced to six months in prison and 74 lashes on the charge of "insulting judicial authorities". He has also been imprisoned in Fashafouyeh Prison for one year where he was also denied access to medical services.

Cancellation of citizenship 
In a message to Ali Khamenei, the Supreme Leader and Hassan Rouhani, the President of Iran, Fahimi requested the judiciary to revoke his official citizenship due to the regimes dictatorship.

References 

1974 births
Living people
People from Sanandaj
Iranian prisoners and detainees